Noel Henry Graham is a Northern Irish international lawn and indoor bowler.

Bowls career
Graham (born 1968) won a bronze medal in the fours at 1994 Commonwealth Games in Victoria and repeated the feat eight years later at the 2002 Commonwealth Games in Manchester.

In the World Championships he won gold medal in the fours with Jonathan Ross, Neil Booth and Jim Baker and a silver medal with Jim Baker in the pairs during the 2004 World Outdoor Bowls Championship.

In 1995, he won the Hong Kong International Bowls Classic singles title, in addition to winning three pairs titles in 1999, 2000 and 2005. He won the 1995 Irish National Bowls Championships singles  and subsequently won the singles at the British Isles Bowls Championships in 1996.

Graham retired from international competition in 2014.

References

Male lawn bowls players from Northern Ireland
Sportspeople from Belfast
Commonwealth Games bronze medallists for Northern Ireland
Bowls World Champions
Commonwealth Games medallists in lawn bowls
1968 births
Living people
Bowls players at the 1994 Commonwealth Games
Bowls players at the 2002 Commonwealth Games
Bowls European Champions
Medallists at the 1994 Commonwealth Games
Medallists at the 2002 Commonwealth Games